Drummuir is a small village in Scotland, in the traditional county of Banffshire, and in the Moray council area. It is between Dufftown (five miles), Keith (seven/eight miles) and Huntly (nine miles).

Its old name was Botriphnie (Gaelic: Both Draighnigh), and this is the name still sometimes used for the parish. Drummuir comes from Druim Iubhair, Scottish Gaelic for "Yew Ridge"; the name Botriphnie, may come from Pictish origins and be a "Pit-" name, meaning "Thorn Farm".

Drummuir's biggest building is "Drummuir Castle", a Strawberry Hill-type Gothic Victorian building, with extensive gardens. The castle was built by the Gordon-Duffs who are still the main landowners in the area.

The Keith and Dufftown Railway runs by the village from a defunct distillery. It is rarely used now, but is still in good condition. A train is regularly run by the Keith and Dufftown railway association. Drummuir railway station once served the castle, local farms and dwellings whilst Drummuir Curlers' Platform was a private station once used by curlers on Loch Park.

The River Isla which flows down to Keith through Strathisla, and Davidston Burn (or Davieburn), a small tributary of the Isla are the two main rivers in the area. Ben Rinnes is clearly visible to the west, and makes a strong visual impression.

In 2002, this normally peaceful community was disturbed when a body of a teenage girl was found there. 

Villages in Moray